The Alliance for Progress and Freedom is a political party in Burkina Faso (formerly Upper Volta).
At the last legislative elections, 5 May 2002, the party won 0.7% of the popular vote and 1 out of 111 seats.

Political parties in Burkina Faso